Kristopher Thomas "Kris" Miller (born 29 September 1980) is an Australian rules footballer currently playing with South Fremantle in the West Australian Football League (WAFL). He previously represented East Fremantle, and was also rookie-listed by the West Coast Eagles in the Australian Football League (AFL) for two seasons between 2001 and 2002. He played his 250th WAFL game on 26 June 2011, the first player since Marty Atkins in 2005. In 2012 he won his third best and fairest award at South Fremantle. He brought up his 300th WAFL game in the 2014 season.

Kris Miller is a dashing right hand top order batsmen for the Hay Park Cricket Club. A prolific scorer in the Bunbury Districts Cricket Association and over his career averaging 37 with a high score of 204 and 89 wickets at 18.

References

1980 births
East Fremantle Football Club players
South Fremantle Football Club players
Living people
Australian rules footballers from Western Australia